Pinetree or pine tree may refer to:

Vegetation
 Pine, coniferous trees in the genus Pinus
 Norfolk Island pine, Araucaria heterophylla, a coniferous tree
 Wollemi pine, Wollemia nobilis, a coniferous tree
 Screw pine, various species of plants in the genus Pandanus
 Ground pine (disambiguation)
 Running pine, Lycopodium clavatum a species of clubmoss

Other uses
 Pinetree Secondary School, in British Columbia, Canada
 Pine Tree (album), by South Korean singer Kangta
 Colin Meads or Colin "Pinetree" Meads (1936–2017), New Zealand rugby union footballer
 Pinetree Line, a North-American radar system of the Cold War era

See also
 Pine (disambiguation)